Umingan, officially the Municipality of Umingan, is a 1st class municipality in the province of Pangasinan, Philippines. According to the 2020 census, it has a population of 77,074 people. Jan Andrie

Geography

Barangays
Umingan is politically subdivided into 58 barangays. These barangays are headed by elected officials: Barangay Captain, Barangay Council, whose members are called Barangay Councilors. All are elected every three years.

Climate

Demographics

Economy 

The town is a major producer of squash (kalabasa).

Government

Umigan, belonging to the sixth congressional district of the province of Pangasinan, is governed by a mayor designated as its local chief executive and by a municipal council as its legislative body in accordance with the Local Government Code. The mayor, vice mayor, and the councilors are elected directly by the people through an election which is being held every three years.

Elected officials

Education

Elementary schools 

Government elementary schools:

 Annam Elementary School
 Bantug Elementary School
 Baracbac Elementary School
 Barat Elementary School
 Celestino L. Clariza Elementary School (Lauren)
 Calitlitan Elementary School
 Casilan Elementary School
 Cadiz Elementary School
 Decreto Community School
 Diket Elementary School
 Diaz Elementary School
 Don Montano Elementary School
 Doña Nena Elementary School (Nancalabasaan)
 Esperanza Elementary School
 Evangelista Elementary School
 Flores Elementary School
 Gonzales Elementary School
 La Paz Elementary School
 Lubong Elementary School
 Luna Weste Elementary School
 Luna Este Elementary School 
 Pemienta Elementary School
 Mantacdang Elementary School
 Maseil-seil-Alo-o Elementary School
 Nampalcan-Molina Elementary School
 Ricos Elementary School
 Rosita Y. Sabado Elementary School (Sinabaan)
 San Juan Elementary School
 San Leon Elementary School
 San Pablo Elementary School
 San Vicente Elementary School
 Umingan Central Elementary School

Private:
 Christian Life Learning Center
 Divine Shepherd Montessori and High School
 Immaculate Conception Catholic School
 Kingsville Academy Umingan
 Quezon Memorial Academy

Secondary schools 

Government High Schools:
 Baracbac National High School
 Cabalitian National High School
 Flores National High School
 La Paz National High School
 Maseil-seil - Alo-o National High School
 Prado National High School
 Umingan Central National High School

Private:
 Christian Life Learning Center
 Divine Shepherd Montessori and High School
 Immaculate Conception Catholic School
 Kingsville Academy
 Quezon Memorial Academy

Tertiary schools 
Private institutions:
 Hope of Melbourne Colleges Foundation
 Santa Catalina College of Science and Technology

References

External links

 Umingan Profile at PhilAtlas.com
 Municipal Profile at the National Competitiveness Council of the Philippines
 Umingan at the Pangasinan Government Website
 Local Governance Performance Management System
 [ Philippine Standard Geographic Code]
 Philippine Census Information

Municipalities of Pangasinan